The Salt Lake City Open is a defunct men's tennis tournament that was part of the USLTA Indoor Circuit and played in 1973 and 1974. The event was held in Salt Lake City, Utah and was played on indoor hard courts. Jimmy Connors won the singles title at both editions.

Past finals

Singles

Doubles

References

External links
 ATP Archives

Defunct tennis tournaments in the United States